Carlos Pedraza Olguín (December 31, 1913 - November 20, 2000) was a Chilean painter. He won the National Prize of Art of Chile in 1979.

References

1913 births
2000 deaths
People from Antofagasta Province
University of Chile alumni
Chilean male painters
20th-century Chilean painters
Chilean male artists
Male painters
20th-century Chilean male artists